Crawshay is a surname. Notable people with the surname include:

Crawshay Bailey (1789–1872), English industrialist who became one of the great iron-masters of Wales
David Crawshay (born 1979), Australian rower
Eliot Crawshay-Williams (1879–1962), British author, officer, and Liberal Party politician
Geoffrey Crawshay (1892–1954), Welsh soldier and social benefactor who is most notable for his connections to rugby union
Joseph Edward Crawshay Partridge (1890–1969), Welsh born international rugby union player
Richard Crawshay (1739–1810), London iron merchant and then South Wales ironmaster
Robert Thompson Crawshay (1817–1879), British ironmaster
Rose Mary Crawshay (1828–1907), English philanthropist, wife of Robert Thompson Crawshay
William Crawshay I (1764–1834), South Wales industrialist
William Crawshay II (1788–1867), the son of William Crawshay I

See also
Crawshay's zebra (Equus quagga crawshayi), a subspecies of the plains zebra
Rose Mary Crawshay Prize, literary prize for female scholars